Gilbert Harrison may refer to:

 Gilbert A. Harrison (1915–2008), owner and editor of The New Republic magazine
 Gilbert Harrison (rugby) (1858–1894), English philatelist, and rugby union footballer who played in the 1870s and 1880s
 Reverend Gilbert Harrison, the inventor of the slip catching cradle
 Gilbert Harrison, investment banker and founder of Financo, Inc.